The women's 3000 meter at the 2017 KNSB Dutch Single Distance Championships took place in Heerenveen at the Thialf ice skating rink on Thursday 29 December 2016. Although this tournament was held in 2016, it was part of the 2016–2017 speed skating season.

There were 16 participants.

Title holder was Ireen Wüst.

Overview

Result

Draw

Source:

References

Single Distance Championships
2017 Single Distance
World